Ottikon may refer to:

 Ottikon (Gossau), a settlement in the municipality of Gossau, Canton of Zürich, Switzerland
 Ottikon (Illnau-Effretikon), a settlement in the municipality of Illnau-Effretikon, Canton of Zürich, Switzerland